Nikola Franković (born 9 November 1982) is a retired Croatian male water polo player. He was a member of the Croatia men's national water polo team, playing as a driver. He was a part of the  team at the 2004 Summer Olympics. On club level he played for VK Primorje and HAVK Mladost in Croatia. With Mladost, Franković won the national championship in 2008.

References

1982 births
Living people
Croatian male water polo players
Water polo players at the 2004 Summer Olympics
Olympic water polo players of Croatia
Sportspeople from Rijeka